Lord William Howard (19 December 1563 – 7 October 1640) was an English nobleman and antiquary, sometimes known as "Belted or Bauld (bold) Will".

Early life

Howard was born on 19 December 1563 at Audley End in Essex. He was the third son of Thomas Howard, 4th Duke of Norfolk, and, his second wife, Margaret (née Audley) Dudley. His elder brother was Lord Thomas Howard, later 1st Earl of Suffolk and his sister was Lady Margaret Howard (wife of Robert Sackville, 2nd Earl of Dorset). His father, had previously been married to his mother's cousin, Lady Mary FitzAlan, second daughter and sole heiress, in her issue, of Henry FitzAlan, 19th Earl of Arundel and Lady Katherine Grey (second daughter of Thomas Grey, 2nd Marquess of Dorset). From that marriage, Lord William had one elder half-brother, Philip Howard, 20th Earl of Arundel. After his mother's death around 1563, his father married, thirdly, Elizabeth (née Leyburne) Dacre (widow of Thomas Dacre, 4th Baron Dacre and the eldest daughter of Sir James Leyburne of Cunswick).

William's father, a Catholic with a Protestant education, was arrested in 1569, because of involvement in intrigues against Queen Elizabeth. Although he was briefly released, in September 1571 he was imprisoned again after his participation in the Ridolfi Plot was discovered and he was executed in June 1572. After Norfolk's death, William and his siblings Philip, Thomas and Margaret were left in the care of their uncle, Henry Howard, who also he took charge of their education. During this time, William and his siblings lived with their uncle at Audley End. 

His paternal grandparents were Lord Henry Howard, styled Earl of Surrey (the eldest son of Thomas Howard, 3rd Duke of Norfolk) and Lady Frances de Vere (third daughter of John de Vere, 15th Earl of Oxford and, his second wife, Elizabeth Trussell, daughter and heiress of Sir John Trussell). After his grandfather's execution in 1547, his grandmother married Thomas Staynings of East Soham. His mother, the widow of Lord Henry Dudley (the youngest son of John Dudley, 1st Duke of Northumberland), was the daughter of Thomas Audley, 1st Baron Audley of Walden and, his second wife, Lady Elizabeth Grey (third daughter of Thomas Grey, 1st Marquess of Dorset).

Career
After his marriage in 1577, he went up to the University of Cambridge. Lord William was a learned and accomplished scholar, praised by William Camden, to whom he sent inscriptions and drawings from relics collected by him from the Roman wall, as "a singular lover of valuable antiquity and learned withal."  Sir Walter Scott referred to him as "Belted Will" in the Lay of the Last Minstrel.

Being suspected of treasonable intentions together with his half-brother, Philip, Earl of Arundel (husband of his sister-in-law Anne Dacre), he was imprisoned in 1583, 1585 and 1589. He joined the Church of Rome in 1584, both brothers being dispossessed by the queen of a portion of their Dacre estates, which were, however, restored in 1601 for a payment of £10,000.

Howard then took up residence with his children and grandchildren at Naworth Castle in Cumberland, restored the castle, improved the estate and established order in that part of the country. He collected a valuable library, of which most of the printed works remain at Naworth, though the manuscripts have been dispersed, a portion being now among the Arundel manuscripts in the College of Arms; he corresponded with James Ussher and was intimate with Camden, Sir Henry Spelman, and Sir Robert Cotton, whose eldest son married his daughter. In 1592, he published an edition of Florence of Worcester's Chronicon ex Chronicis, dedicated to Lord Burghley, and drew up a genealogy of his family.

In 1603, on the accession of James I to the English throne, Howard was restored in blood. In 1618 he was made one of the commissioners for the border, and performed services in upholding the law and suppressing marauders.

Personal life
On 28 October 1577, he married his step-sister Elizabeth Dacre, third daughter of Thomas Dacre, 4th Baron Dacre and the former Elizabeth Leyburne. She was also the sister and co-heiress of George Dacre, 5th Baron Dacre. After Elizabeth's father died, her mother married his father in 1566. Together, Elizabeth and William were the parents of:

 Sir Philip Howard (b. 1581), who married Margaret Carryl (–), daughter of Sir John Carryl of Harting.
 Sir Francis Howard (1588–1660) of Corby Castle who married Margaret Preston, daughter of John Preston of Furness. After her death in 1625, he married Mary Widdrington, a daughter of Sir Henry Widdrington.
 Sir William Howard
 Sir Charles Howard
 Col. Sir Thomas Howard, who married Elizabeth Eure, eldest daughter of Sir William Eure, MP for Scarborough (third son of William Eure, 2nd Baron Eure), and Catherine Bowes, de jure suo jure Baroness Scrope of Bolton (only child of Sir William Bowes of Streatlam Castle and, his first wife, Mary Scrope, only child by his first wife of Henry Scrope, 9th Baron Scrope of Bolton).
 Margaret Howard (–), who married Sir Thomas Cotton, 2nd Baronet of Conington, in 1617.
 Mary Howard, who married Sir John Wintour.
 Elizabeth Howard, who married, as his first wife, Sir Henry Bedingfeld of Oxburgh Hall, son and heir of Thomas Bedingfeld and Frances Jerningham (daughter and co-heiress of John Jerningham, of Somerleyton).

He died on 7 October 1640 at Greystoke, to which place he had been removed when failing in health, to escape the Scots who were threatening an advance on Naworth.  His eldest son Philip was the grandfather of Charles, 1st Earl of Carlisle, and his second son Francis was the ancestor of the Howards of Corby.

Legacy
William Howard School, the secondary school in Brampton, Cumbria, is named after him.

References

External links

Attribution

1563 births
1640 deaths
Alumni of St John's College, Cambridge
Younger sons of dukes
English antiquarians
16th-century antiquarians
17th-century antiquarians
16th-century English people
17th-century English people
William Howard